"Hide the Wine" is a song recorded by American country music singer Carly Pearce.  It was released in December 2017 as the second and final single from her debut studio album, Every Little Thing.  The song was written by Ashley Gorley, Luke Laird and Hillary Lindsey.

Content
Pearce said that she wanted to record the song before she even had a record contract, and was able to record it after another artist had declined it. She said that she wanted it to be the second single to stand as a contrast from the slower "Every Little Thing". The song is about "having a little too much to drink and then calling an old flame that you probably shouldn't".

In October 2018, Pearce revealed that Little Big Town had recorded the song in 2017, but chose not to include it on an album.

Commercial performance
The song has sold 102,000 copies in the United States as of October 2018.

Charts & Certifications

Weekly charts

Year-end charts

Certifications

References

 

2017 singles
2017 songs
Big Machine Records singles
Carly Pearce songs
Country ballads
Song recordings produced by busbee
Songs written by Ashley Gorley
Songs written by Luke Laird
Songs written by Hillary Lindsey